Hiltenfingen is a municipality in the district of Augsburg in Bavaria in Germany. It is part of the administrative region of Swabia and of the Verwaltungsgemeinschaft of Langerringen.

It is located on the river Wertach, about 30 km south of Augsburg and one kilometer southwest of Schwabmünchen.

References

Augsburg (district)